The 2018 Marine Harvest Premiership is the 22nd season of the Premier Division, the highest division in Shinty. The season began on 3 March 2018 consisting of 10 teams from across Scotland. The 4th season with Marine Harvest as title sponsors saw the reigning champions Kinlochshiel challenging for their 2nd Premiership title. 2018 Marine Harvest Premiership champions were Newtonmore Camanachd Club.

The 2018 Cup competitions competed will be the Camanachd Cup, Macaulay Cup, MacTavish Cup (North District teams only) and the Glasgow Celtic Society Cup (South District teams only).

Any team winning all 4 major trophies for which they are eligible to take part in will achieve the coveted Shinty Grand Slam.

Teams

League summary

League table
Updated 4 February 2019

Form 
Updated 20 August 2018*Last 5 matches

Top Scorer(s) 
Top Scorer or Scorers onlyUpdated 14 August 2018

References

Shinty
2018 in Scottish sport